Joseph Eberendu Ahaneku (born October 1, 1962) is an academic and Consultant Chemical Pathologist of Nnamdi Azikiwe University, Awka, Nigeria . Ahaneku is the Former Vice Chancellor of Nnamdi Azikiwe University, Awka ( Monday 26 May 2014 - Wednesday May 2019). He hails from Nnarambia Ahiara Ahiazu Mbaise, Imo State, Nigeria.

Education

Joseph started his Education in St. Joseph's Primary School Eke-Nguru, where he received his primary school leaving certificate. He proceeded to Mbaise Secondary School, Aboh-Mbaise, where he received his secondary school leaving certificate. He attended University of Ibadan where he got his first Degree (BSc) and later his PGD in University College Hospital. There he also earned his MSc. He later completed his PhD at Ibadan and Institute of Biology London, Cboi.

Career
  
Ahaneku joined Nnamdi Azikiwe University Teaching Hospital, Nnewi in 1991 as lecturer 1 . In 1992 he became a consultant chemical pathologist. In 1992 he became a senior lecturer . In 1994 he reached Professor . In 1997 he was the national vice-president of the Nigerian Association of Clinical Chemists . He worked as a research fellow for the Department of Biochemistry and Cell Biology and foreign research fellow of the Department of Biochemistry Saga Medical School, Saga Japan . From 1995 to 1996 he was senior research scientist and professorial fellow of Second Department of Physiology and as the visiting researcher of South-West Medical Research Foundation, San Antonio, Texas. He was the staff and head of department for the Department of Chemical Pathology and sub-dean of the School of Postgraduate Studies, Nnamdi Azikiwe University, Awka . From 2001 to 2003 he was the chairman of the board of trustees of O.M Okonkwo foundation and Demlaz Group of Companies and an executive member of Mbaise Frontline Circle also the executive director of JG ventures and rental services.

Recognition 
In 1992 the Science and Technology Agency of Japan awarded him a fellowship and grant . He was also awarded in 1994 for promotion of science in Japan Society for the Promotion of Science (JSPS) . He earned a second fellowship and grant in 1997 . In 1996 he was awarded a Pfizer Health Research Foundation (Japan) Research Publication grant .

Publications

He has published over 52 scientific papers.

Personal life
Joseph Ahaneku is married to Prof. Dr. (Mrs.) Gladys I. Ahaneku PhD, mni and has five children namely; Chibueze Ahaneku, Chinaza Ahaneku, Chimeremeze Ahaneku, Chukwumaijem Ahaneku and Chijindu Ahaneku.

References

1962 births
Living people
Vice-Chancellors of Nigerian universities
Academic staff of Nnamdi Azikiwe University
University of Ibadan alumni